Shimodaia is a genus of brachiopods belonging to the family Frenulinidae.

The species of this genus are found in Japan.

Species:

Shimodaia macclesfieldensis 
Shimodaia pterygiota

References

Brachiopod genera